Wuzlam, also called Uldeme (Ouldémé), is an Afro-Asiatic language of the Chadic branch. It is spoken in northern Cameroon.

The northeastern edge of this massif is inhabited by speakers of Pelasla or Gwendelé, culturally assimilated to the Wuzlam, or "Ouldémé".

Notes

References
 Veronique de Colombel.  1997.  La langue ouldeme nord-Cameroun:  précis de grammaire, texte, lexique.  Paris:  Association LInguistique Africaine.
 D. Pierre Provoost & S. Pierre Koulifa.  1987.  Essai sur la langue uldeme.  Archives d'anthropologie 30.  Tervuren:  Musee Royal de l'Afrique Central.

Biu-Mandara languages
Languages of Cameroon